Sirugavoor, is a suburb located North of Chennai, a metropolitan city in Tamil Nadu, India.

Location
Sirugavoor is located in between Madhavaram, Red Hills, Minjur and Gnayiru in North of Chennai. The arterial road in Sirugavoor is Madhavaram - Arumandai Road.

References

External links
CMDA Official Webpage

Neighbourhoods in Chennai